Stanisławów  is a village in the administrative district of Gmina Odrzywół, within Przysucha County, Masovian Voivodeship, in east-central Poland. The village administration is taken care of by the officially appointed Zbiegniew Kwasniak

References

Villages in Przysucha County